Andrzej Marchel (born 16 March 1964) is a former Polish footballer. Marchel spent the majority of his career playing for Lechia Gdańsk, with the exceptions of playing two seasons with Olimpia Poznań.

Biography

Marchel broke into the Lechia Gdańsk first team in 1981, making his debut against Gwardia Koszalin at the age of 17. While in his first two seasons Lechia were not successful, even being relegated to the third tier at the end of his second season, Marchel was involved in one of the most important times in Lechia's history. While still a teenager, Marchel won the III liga for the 1982–83 season, he played in every game during the cup run which won the Polish Cup in 1983, beating Piast Gliwice in the final, played in the Polish SuperCup win over Lech Poznań in 1983, played in both games against Juventus, which were Lechia's first ever European games in the 1983–84 European Cup Winners' Cup, and won promotion to the top division by winning the II liga for the 1983–84 season. Marchel played one season with Lechia in the I liga before moving to Olimpia Poznań due to his military service. During his time with Olimpia he played 5 games over 2 seasons, moving back to Lechia Gdańsk after his military service was complete. After rejoining Lechia he went on to play 155 games during his second spell, and scoring 6 goals in all competitions. He played his last professional game in a 1-0 defeat to Pogoń Szczecin, before retiring from football aged 28. Since 2011 Marchel has been involved with playing for the Lechia Gdańsk Oldboj team.

Honours

Lechia Gdańsk

Polish Cup
Winners: 1983

Polish SuperCup
Winners: 1983

II liga (western group)
Winners: 1983–84

III liga (group II)
Winners: 1982–83

References

1964 births
Living people
Lechia Gdańsk players
Olimpia Poznań players
Polish footballers
Association football defenders
People from Wejherowo
Sportspeople from Pomeranian Voivodeship